

Buildings and structures

Buildings
 About 1140
 Church of Santa Maria e San Donato in Murano, Republic of Venice completed.
 Rudra Mahalaya Temple in Siddhpur, India, completed.
 Church of St Mary and St David, Kilpeck, and first stone Church of St John the Evangelist, Shobdon, both by members of the Herefordshire School in England, built.
  Great church of Cîteaux Abbey begun.
 1143 – In the Kingdom of Sicily
 Trani Cathedral completed (except the campanile).
 Mosaic decoration of Cappella Palatina in Palazzo dei Normanni, Palermo, partly completed.
 1144: June 11 – Basilica of St Denis near Paris in the Kingdom of France consecrated, the first Gothic church.
 1145 – Basilica of Sainte-Trinité, Cherbourg-en-Cotentin, Normandy, consecrated.
 1147
 Basilica of San Frediano in Lucca completed.
 Saint-Pierre de Montmartre in Paris consecrated.
 1149 – Akebäck Church on Gotland is inaugurated.
 1149: July 15 – Church of the Holy Sepulchre in Jerusalem consecrated after reconstruction.
 Probable decade – Lyngsjö Church, Sweden, built.

Births
Adela of Champagne, Queen of France
Alan Fitz Walter, High Steward of Scotland
Eliezer ben Joel HaLevi, German rabbi

Deaths

12th-century architecture
1140s works